Sergio Guenza (9 January 1933 – 6 April 2020) was an Italian football manager.

Career
Guenza was the head coach of the Italy women's national team in 1979–1981, 1989–1993 and 1995–1997, including at the 1991 FIFA Women's World Cup.

Personal life
Guenza died on 6 April 2020 at the age of 87.

References

External links
 
 
 Sergio Guenza at Soccerdonna.de 

1933 births
2020 deaths
Italian footballers
L'Aquila Calcio 1927 players
S.S.D. Tivoli Calcio 1919 players
A.S.D. Città di Foligno 1928 players
Italian football managers
Women's association football managers
Italy women's national football team managers
1991 FIFA Women's World Cup managers
S.S. Lazio non-playing staff
Association footballers not categorized by position